Cries Hannah is an American post-hardcore and metalcore band from Poplar Bluff, Missouri. The band began in 2003 and continued until 2007. However, in 2020, the band reunited and currently consists of Matthew Tompkins and Trey Davis.

History
The band released, "Oh, Death Where is Thy Sting" in 2006 and signed later that year with Crash Music Inc. Under Crash Music they recorded at First Street Studios (As Cities Burn, Rookie of the Year, The Chariot) and released their debut album, "Beloved... I Caught You When You Fell." Following that release Cries Hannah toured throughout the Southern and Midwestern United States. In the spring of 2007, the band was involved in a bus accident outside of Chicago, IL. None of the members sustained serious injuries, though the bus was destroyed. That summer the band embarked on what would be their final tour, concluding their remaining shows in late 2007.

In May of 2020, Matthew Tompkins, Matt Boyd, and Trey Davis began writing new music for Cries Hannah. On July 2, 2021, Cries Hannah released "The Daydreamer" EP on all streaming platforms, independently. The EP was self-recorded and self-produced, while Jack Daniels (War of Ages) at Sicktones Studios mastered the album.

Members
Current Line-up
 Matthew Tompkins - Vocals (2003-2007; 2020-Present)
 Trey Davis - Guitar (2003-2007; 2020-Present)

Former
 Matt Boyd - Drums (2003-2006, 2020)
Jeff Brannon - Drums (2006-2007)
Josh Kassinger - Guitar (2005-2006), Drums (2007)
Jason Savage - Bass (2006-2007)
 Eric Bieller - Bass (2005-2006)
 Adam Fears - Bass (2004-2005)
 Ross Goins - Bass (2003-2004)
Christopher Gonzalez- undetermined (2003-2004)

Discography
Studio albums
 Oh, Death Where is Thy Sting EP (2005)
 Beloved... I Caught You When You Fell (2006)
Hopeless, the Writer (2019)
The Daydreamer EP (2021)
The Sleepwalker (2022)

References

American Christian metal musical groups
Heavy metal musical groups from Missouri
Musical groups established in 2003
Musical groups disestablished in 2007
Musical groups reestablished in 2020